Società Sportiva Verbania Calcio, shortened as Verbania, is an Italian association football club located in the town of Verbania, Piedmont. Currently it plays in Serie D.

History

The club was founded in 1959 after the merging of Libertas Pallanza and Verbania Sportiva that was founded in 1947 and played the season, 1947–48, in Serie C, the third level of Italian football.

The new club spent the majority of its history in the semi-professional and regional levels of Italian Football, in Serie D and Eccellenza; but in the early period of its history, it played 7 seasons in Serie C (currently Lega Pro Prima Divisione), from 1966–67 to 1972–73.

In 2006 the sports title was transferred from A.S.D. Verbania Calcio to A.S.D. Amici del Verbania, which the former was liquidated.

In the season 2011–12 it was promoted from Eccellenza Piedmont and Aosta Valley/A to Serie D.

Colors, badge and stadium
The club's colour is white ringed by a blue-yellow-red strip and the club's home ground is the Stadio Carlo Pedroli.

Notable players
One of the club's most notable players is Maltese striker, Carmel Busuttil, who played over 100 times for Malta, and scored 23 international goals.

Honours
Eccellenza Piedmont and Aosta Valley:
Winners 1: 2011–12
 Regional Coppa Italia Piedmont and Aosta Valley:
Winners 1: 2011–12

Notes and references

External links
 Verbania Calcio official website

Football clubs in Piedmont and Aosta Valley
Sport in Verbania
Association football clubs established in 1959
Serie C clubs
1959 establishments in Italy